Global Infectious Diseases and Epidemiology Online Network (GIDEON) is a web-based program for decision support and informatics in the fields of Infectious Diseases and Geographic Medicine. Due to the advancement of both disease research and digital media, print media can no longer follow the dynamics of outbreaks and epidemics as they emerge in "real time." As of 2005, more than 300 generic infectious diseases occur haphazardly in time and space and are challenged by over 250 drugs and vaccines. 1,500 species of pathogenic bacteria, viruses, parasites and fungi have been described. GIDEON works to combat this by creating a diagnosis through geographical indicators, a map of the status of the disease in history, a detailed list of potential vaccines and treatments, and finally listing all the potential species of the disease or outbreak such as bacterial classifications.


Organization

GIDEON consists of four modules.  The first Diagnosis module generates a Bayesian ranked differential diagnosis based on signs, symptoms, laboratory tests, country of origin and incubation period – and can be used for diagnosis support and simulation of all infectious diseases in all countries. Since the program is web-based, this module can also be adapted to disease and bioterror surveillance.

The second module follows the epidemiology of individual diseases, including their global background and status in each of 205 countries and regions. All past and current outbreaks of all diseases, in all countries, are described in detail. The user may also access a list of diseases compatible with any combination of agent, vector, vehicle, reservoir and country (for example, one could list all the mosquito-borne flaviviruses of Brazil which have an avian reservoir). Over 30,000 graphs display all the data, and are updated in "real time". These graphs can be used for preparation of PowerPoint displays, pamphlets, lecture notes, etc. Several thousand high-quality images are also available, including clinical lesions, roentgenograms, Photomicrographs and disease life cycles.

The third module is an interactive encyclopedia which incorporates the pharmacology, usage, testing standards and global trade names of all antiinfective drugs and vaccines.

The fourth module is designed to identify or characterize all species of bacteria, mycobacteria and yeasts. The database includes 50 to 100 taxa which may not appear in standard texts and laboratory databases for several months.

Additional options allow users to add data (in their own font / language) relevant to their own institution, electronic patient charts, material from the internet, important telephone numbers, drug prices, antimicrobial resistance patterns, etc. This form of custom data is particularly useful when running GIDEON on institutional networks. The data in GIDEON are derived from:
 all peer-reviewed journals in the fields of Infectious Diseases, Pediatrics, Internal Medicine, Tropical Medicine, Travel Medicine, Antimicrobial Pharmacology and Clinical Microbiology
 a monthly electronic literature search based on all relevant keywords
 all available health ministry reports (both printed and electronic)
 standard texts
 abstracts of major meetings

References

Epidemiological study projects
Medical expert systems
Expert systems
Infectious disease organizations
Health informatics
Online databases
Parasitic diseases
Tropical diseases